Albert Nicolai Schioldann (21 January 1843 - 23 February 1917) was a Danish master mason, developer and philanthropist.

Early life and education
Schioldann was born on 21 January 1843 in Copenhagen, the son of architect and master mason J.N. Schioldann and wife née Christensen. He followed in his father's footsteps, apprenticing as a mason.

Career
Schioldann ran a successful business as a master mason and developer. He was also active as an architect. He has for instance designed Theodor Neubert's Villa Bell Mare at Strandvejen 255 in Skovshoved (1889).

He was a freemason and served as inspector at Kronprins Frederiks og Kronprinsesse Louises Stiftelse,

Personal life
Schioldann was married to Frederikke Christiane née Meyer. They lived on the first floor in the building at Gammel Kongevej 136-138. Schioldann  was the owner of the building and had himself constructed it the same year.

Philanthropy

Schioldanns Stiftelse

Schioldann founded Schioldanns Stiftelse at  Hørsholmsgade 22 in Nørrebro. The five-storey building was completed in 1902 to designs by the architect Emil Jørgensen and provided free accommodation for families and individuals in difficult circumstances. Schioldann was chairman of the board until his death.

Work for deaf people
Schioldann, who had a deaf son, Ove Schioldann, was very active in the work for improving the living conditions for the deaf. He was a board member of  Døvstummeforeningen af 1866 and Arbejdshjemmet for døvstumme Piger. He constructed the Church of the Deaf and was also here a board member.

Døvstummeforeningen af 1866 made him an honorary member in 1906.

Honours
Schioldann was awarded the title Justitsråd and created a Knight in the Order of the Dannebrog. The street Schioldannsvej in Charlottenlund is named after him.

References

External links

19th-century Danish businesspeople
20th-century Danish businesspeople
Danish bricklayers
Danish construction businesspeople
Danish philanthropists
Businesspeople from Copenhagen
Danish Freemasons
Knights of the Order of the Dannebrog
1843 births
1917 deaths
19th-century philanthropists